The Feni Islands are an island group in Papua New Guinea, located east of New Ireland, at . It is a part of the Bismarck Archipelago. The largest island of the group is Ambitle, the other island is Babase Island.

References

External links
 Feni Islands on oceandots.com

Islands of Papua New Guinea
New Ireland Province